The Kelsey City City Hall (also known as the Lake Park Town Hall) is a historic site in Lake Park, Florida. It is located at 535 Park Avenue. On September 3, 1981, it was added to the U.S. National Register of Historic Places.

References

External links

 Palm Beach County listings at National Register of Historic Places
 Florida's Office of Cultural and Historical Programs
 Palm Beach County listings
 Lake Park City Hall

National Register of Historic Places in Palm Beach County, Florida
City and town halls in Florida
City and town halls on the National Register of Historic Places in Florida